The article contains the information of 2nd Division's 2014/15 football season. This is the 3rd rated football competition in Iran after the Azadegan League and Persian Gulf Cup.

The league is composed of 40 teams divided into four divisions of 10 teams each, whose teams will be divided geographically.  Teams will play only other teams in their own division, once at home and once away for a total of 20 matches each.

First round

Group A

Group B

Group C

Group D

Second round

Group A
 Winner Group A
 3rd place Group A
 Winner Group C
 3rd place Group C
 Runner-up Group B
 Runner-up Group D

Group B
 Winner Group B
 3rd place Group B
 Winner Group D
 3rd place Group D
 Runner-up Group A
 Runner-up Group C

Final

(Bahman Shiraz did not show up, Aluminium Arak awarded championship 2014-15)

2nd Division  Play-off

References

League 2 (Iran) seasons
3